Mordellistena arabissa is a beetle in the genus Mordellistena of the family Mordellidae. It was described in 1957 by Franciscolo.

References

arabissa
Beetles described in 1957